WSNL (600 AM) is a commercial radio station licensed to Flint, Michigan.  It is owned by the Christian Broadcasting System and broadcasts a Christian talk and teaching radio format.  The studios and offices are on Saginaw Street in Flint.

By day, WSNL is powered at 440 watts.  At night, power is reduced to 250 watts.  It uses a directional antenna with a three-tower array.  The transmitter is on Morrish Road at Grand Blanc Road in Swartz Creek, Michigan.  Programming is also heard on 250-watt FM translator W293CA at 106.5 MHz in Flint.

Programming 
WSNL carries brokered programming, where hosts buy time on the station and may use their programs to seek donations to their ministries.  National religious leaders heard on WSNL include David Jeremiah, Charles Stanley, Jim Daly, Joyce Meyer and John MacArthur. 

On weekday afternoons, WSNL carries the family finances program The Ramsey Show with Dave Ramsey.  Weekday evenings, it airs conservative political talk from Bill O'Reilly.  Some hours on weekends, WSNL plays Christian contemporary music and Southern Gospel music.

History

NBC programming
The original call sign was WFLM, standing for FLint, Michigan. The station was purchased in December 1946 by George W. Trendle and H. Allen Campbell, who changed the call letters to WTCB and made the station into Flint's NBC Red Network affiliate. WTCB carried NBC's dramas, comedies, news, sports, soap operas, game shows and big band broadcasts during the "Golden Age of Radio."

The call sign changed to WTAC October 13, 1948.  It was still under Trendle and Campbell's ownership.  WTAC popularly stood for "The Auto City", referring to Chevrolet and Buick plants formerly located in Flint, but the call letters actually stood for Trendle and Campbell.

Top 40
Trendle and Campbell sold WTAC to a Hawaii-based group in 1954.  Under the ownership of Radio Hawaii, Inc., WTAC shed its NBC affiliation to become one of Michigan's first Top 40 music stations in 1956.  Its original program director was Mike Joseph, who would launch the legendary WKNR "Keener 13" in Detroit in 1963 and later went on to create the Hot Hits format in the early 1970s.  

J.P. McCarthy, later an institution in morning drive time radio for decades at 760 WJR Detroit, was WTAC's original Top 40 nighttime disc jockey in 1956.  The station was also owned for a time by the Chess brothers, who owned and operated Chess Records. Chess sold the station in 1961 to a Philadelphia group that included Gene Milner who became manager of the station.

During WTAC run as a Top 40 rock station, WTAC's engineer was Robert "Bob" Garner, who said he hated rock music except for Chuck Berry's "My Ding-a-Ling." In its final years as a Top 40, WTAC helped introduce the Australian heavy metal band AC/DC to American audiences.

Country music and Christian radio
"The Big 600" flourished as a Top 40 contemporary station during the 1960s and 1970s.  But by the 1980s, most listeners to contemporary music had switched to FM stations.  WTAC flipped to a full service, country music format in 1981.  The country sound lasted more than a decade, but again, country listeners began to tune to FM stations for their music. 

During the early and mid-1990s, WTAC operated as a Contemporary Christian music station.  The WTAC call letters are now used on Smile FM's 89.7 FM signal in the Flint area.  Christian Broadcasting System purchased the station in 1997 and installed the current WSNL call sign and its Christian talk and teaching format.  In the 2010s, WSNL added an FM translator station at 106.5 MHz, for listeners who prefer FM radio.

The station had been based in Grand Blanc Township for much of its early history.  Its studios were located near the corner of Hill and Center Roads for decades until moving to South Saginaw Street in 2003.

Translator

References

Sources 
Michiguide.com - WSNL History

External links
Official site

SNL-AM
Radio stations established in 1946
1946 establishments in Michigan
SNL